Herbert Walter Green  (2 April 1878 – 31 December 1918) was an English first-class cricketer and British Army officer.

The son of Walter James and Maria Jane Green, he was born in April 1878 at Watford. Green was educated at Charterhouse School, before going up to Exeter College, Oxford. He played cricket for both Charterhouse and Exeter College, though never featured for Oxford University Cricket Club. After graduating from Oxford, he received a university commission into The Buffs (Royal East Kent Regiment) as a second lieutenant in May 1900. A promotion to lieutenant followed in December 1901. While serving in British India, he played in a first-class cricket match in 1903 for the Europeans cricket team against the Parsees at Poona in the Bombay Presidency Match. Playing as the Europeans wicket-keeper, he took two catches in the match, while batting he was dismissed for 5 runs in the Europeans first innings by K. S. Kapadia, while in their second innings he was dismissed by Kekhashru Mistry for 8 runs. During his service in India, Green also played minor matches for Mysore. He was seconded for service with the Colonial Office in September 1910, where he was sent to Nigeria to serve with the Royal West African Frontier Force. While still seconded to the Colonial Office, he was promoted to captain in October 1911. 

Green was still serving in Nigeria when the First World War began in July 1914. Promoted to major in September 1915, he was posted to France in 1916 and briefly commanded a battalion of the Essex Regiment, while holding the temporary rank of lieutenant colonel. Following his secondment to the Essex Regiment, Green returned to The Buffs where he fought in the Battle of the Somme. He was awarded the Distinguished Service Order in the 1917 New Year Honours, 'for gallant and distinguished service in the field'. He was made a brevet lieutenant colonel in December 1917, having been made a temporary brigadier-general the previous month while commanding the 10th Infantry Brigade. He returned to England in April 1918 where he supervised volunteer training on the East Coast, before returning to the Western Front in October 1918, where he commanded 1st Battalion of the Queen's. He was seriously wounded in action at Landrecies on 7 November, just four days prior to the Armistice of 11 November 1918. He was evacuated to No. 8 General Hospital at Rouen, where he died on 31 December 1918 following surgery. He was buried in Rouen at the St Sever Cemetery.

References

External links

1878 births
1918 deaths
People from Watford
People educated at Charterhouse School
Alumni of Exeter College, Oxford
Buffs (Royal East Kent Regiment) officers
English cricketers
Europeans cricketers
British Army brigadiers
Military personnel from Hertfordshire
British Army generals of World War I
Essex Regiment officers
Companions of the Distinguished Service Order
Queen's Royal Regiment officers
British military personnel killed in World War I
British people in colonial India